Brad Gillingham (born 1966) is an American world champion powerlifter and strongman competitor from Minnesota, United States.

Powerlifting
Brad is a 6 time IPF World Powerlifting Champion and a 14 time USAPL National Powerlifting Champion. Brad has won 34 Major Events.
Brad has set IPF Open World Records in the  120+ kg Class with a 395 kg (870) deadlift at the 2011 IPF Pacific Invitational in Melbourne, Australia, and a 397.5 kg (876) deadlift at the 2011 IPF World Championships in Pilsen, Czech Republic. Brad set the IPF Open Classic (RAW) World Record deadlift at the 2013 IPF Classic World Championships in Suzdal, Russia with a 375 kg (826) deadlift. Brad has set 16 IPF Masters World Records with highlights being a 400 kg (881) deadlift at the 2010 IPF World Championships in Potchefstroom, South Africa and a 1057.5 kg (2331) Total at the 2008 IPF Masters World Championships in Palm Springs, California.  
Brad was inducted into the International Powerlifting Federation (IPF) Hall of Fame in November 2006, and  into the IPF North American Powerlifting Federation (NAPF) Hall of Fame earlier that same year.  Brad was a U.S.A. Powerlifting (USAPL) Brother Bennett (Hall of Fame) Award recipient in 2003. Brad was inducted into the Minnesota Chapter of the National Strength Coaches Association (NSCA) Hall of Fame in 2010.

Personal life
Brad graduated from Little Falls, Minnesota Community High School in 1984 and St. Cloud State University in 1989.  He lives in Minneota, Minnesota and is employed by the State of Minnesota. Brad is married to wife Diane and has two daughters Emily (21) and Elizabeth (18).

Brad is part of the First Family of Strength along with his late father Gale Gillingham, a former guard for the Green Bay Packers, and brothers Wade and Karl Gillingham.

Brad is the co-owner of Jackal's Gym in Marshall, Minnesota along with brothers Karl and Wade. Jackal's Gym also has a website with an online store that sells strongman and powerlifting training equipment.

Brad is a Certified Strength and Conditioning Specialist (CSCS) and coaches several elite powerlifters and athletes.

Personal Records
Powerlifting Competition Records:

equipped

Squat -  (at the USAPL Nationals 2004)
Bench press -  (at the USAPL Nationals 2004)
Deadlift -  (at the AC IPF GNC Deadlift 2008 and IPF World Championship 2010)
Total -  (870/633/837) @330 pounds bodyweight (at the USAPL Nationals 2004)

raw (unequipped)

Squat - 
Bench press - 
Deadlift - 
Total -  (716/512/837) (at the USAPL Nationals 2012 RAW)

Record lifts in competition
Squat -  -  USAPL Open American Record 145 kg
Deadlift -  - USAPL Open American Record 145 kg
Total -  - USAPL Open American Record 145 kg
Deadlift -  - USAPL RAW Open American Record +125 kg
Total -  - USAPL RAW Open American Record +125 kg
Deadlift -  - USAPL Masters American Record +125 kg
Total -  - USAPL Masters American Record +125 kg
Squat -  - USAPL RAW Masters American Record +125 kg
Deadlift -  - USAPL RAW Masters American Record +125 kg
Total -  - USAPL RAW Masters American Record +125 kg
Deadlift -  - USAPL Masters National Meet Record +125 kg
Total -  - USAPL Masters National Meet Record +125 kg
Deadlift -  - USAPL RAW Masters II American Record +125 kg
Deadlift -  - USAPL RAW Masters II American Record +125 kg
Deadlift -  - IPF World Open Record +120 kg
Deadlift -  - IPF World Masters Record +125 kg
Deadlift -  - IPF World Masters Record +120 kg
Deadlift -  - IPF World Classic Record +120 kg
Total -  - IPF World Masters Record +125 kg
Total -  - IPF World Masters Record +120 kg

References

External links 
 Official Jackal's Gym web site/online store

American powerlifters
American strength athletes
1970 births
Living people
World Games silver medalists
People from Minneota, Minnesota
Competitors at the 2001 World Games